The 1991 NBA draft took place on June 26, 1991, in New York City, New York. Larry Johnson was selected first overall; he won the 1992 NBA Rookie of the Year award and as a two-time All-Star, was the first player to represent the Charlotte Hornets franchise at an All-Star game.

Dikembe Mutombo was selected fourth overall, and became one of the greatest defensive centers in the history of the league. He was a four-time NBA Defensive Player of the Year award winner and an eight-time All-Star, and played in the league for 18 seasons.

Other notable picks include Kenny Anderson, Steve Smith, Terrell Brandon, Dale Davis and Chris Gatling, who all made All-Star appearances, but with the exception of Brandon at two, each only appeared once.

The remaining picks in the first round failed to make an impact. Billy Owens was selected by the Sacramento Kings but refused to sign with them.  He was traded to the Golden State Warriors in exchange for high-scoring guard Mitch Richmond, a trade that has been regarded as one of the most lopsided in NBA history. Owens was solid but unspectacular in his career, while Richmond was a six-time All-Star and was the 1989 NBA Rookie of the Year. Luc Longley was a three-time NBA Championship winner with the Chicago Bulls and held the record for playing the most NBA games by an Australian (broken by Andrew Bogut during the 2015–16 season).

As of 2011, two players are deceased: Bobby Phills and Bison Dele. Phills died in a car accident involving teammate David Wesley. Dele disappeared in the South Pacific in July 2002, with French authorities claiming that Dele's brother had killed Dele and his girlfriend and thrown them overboard the catamaran they were travelling on. Dele's brother committed suicide in September 2002.

This was the last draft held in New York City until 2001.

Draft

Notable undrafted players

These eligible players were not selected in the 1991 NBA draft but have played at least one game in the NBA.

Early entrants

College underclassmen
The following college basketball players successfully applied for early draft entrance.

  Kenny Anderson – G, Georgia Tech (sophomore)
  Terrell Brandon – G, Oregon (junior)
  Tony Farmer – F, Nebraska (junior)
  Jerome Harmon – G, Louisville (junior)
  Donald Hodge – C, Temple (junior)
  Anderson Hunt – G, UNLV (junior)
  Raoul Hutchens – G, Whittier (junior)
  Ty Moseler – G, Waukesha County Tech (sophomore)
  Chancellor Nichols – F, James Madison (junior)
  Billy Owens – F, Syracuse (junior)
  Brian Williams – F/C, Arizona (junior)

International players
The following international players successfully applied for early draft entrance.

  Žan Tabak – C, Split (Yugoslavia)

Other eligible players

Notes
  Brian Williams changed his name to Bison Dele in 1998.

See also
 List of first overall NBA draft picks

References

External links
 1991 NBA Draft

Draft
National Basketball Association draft
NBA draft
NBA draft
1990s in Manhattan
Basketball in New York City
Sporting events in New York City
Sports in Manhattan
Madison Square Garden